San Francisco Days is the fourth album by Chris Isaak, released in 1993. The album's sound was more upbeat than that of its predecessor, the darker Heart Shaped World, and Isaak's breakthrough hit "Wicked Game". It did not perform as well as Heart Shaped World, but was certified gold by the RIAA while several of its tracks became longtime staples of Isaak's live set. Later in 1993, the song "Two Hearts" was featured in the film True Romance and on its soundtrack. 

The album was also Isaak's last to feature guitarist James Calvin Wilsey, who had been a member of his band since its formation, due to personal conflicts and drug problems. Wilsey only performed on a handful of tracks before departing, including the lead single, "Can't Do a Thing (To Stop Me)". The album was dedicated to the memory of Louie Beeson, who was the sound consultant.

Track listing
All tracks composed by Chris Isaak; except where noted.

 "San Francisco Days"
 "Beautiful Homes"
 "Round 'N' Round"
 "Two Hearts"
 "Can't Do a Thing (To Stop Me)" (Isaak, Brian Elliot)
 "Except the New Girl"
 "Waiting"
 "Move Along"
 "I Want Your Love"
 "5:15"
 "Lonely With a Broken Heart"
 "Solitary Man" (Neil Diamond)

Personnel
Chris Isaak – vocals, guitar
James Calvin Wilsey – lead guitar
Rowland Salley – bass, vocals
Kenney Dale Johnson – drums, vocals
Jimmy Pugh – Hammond B3 organ on "I Want Your Love"
Danny Gatton – lead guitar
Jeff Watson – lead guitar
Tom Brumley – pedal steel guitar

Sales and certifications

References

Chris Isaak albums
1993 albums
Reprise Records albums
Albums produced by Erik Jacobsen